SS Karsik was a German-built cargo steamship. Deutsche Schiff- und Maschinenbau (Deschimag) built her as Soneck for Deutsche Dampfschifffahrts-Gesellschaft "Hansa" in 1938.

The Royal Netherlands Navy seized her in the Dutch East Indies in 1940. She was renamed Karsik and the Dutch Koninklijke Paketvaart-Maatschappij (KPM) operated her until 1963.

In 1963 she was sold, renamed Pearl of Victoria and registered in Panama. She was wrecked in the Red Sea in 1967.

Building
Deschimag built Soneck at its Seebeckwerft in Wesermünde, which is now part of Bremerhaven.

Soneck had a three-cylinder triple-expansion engine plus a Bauer-Wach low-pressure exhaust steam turbine. Exhaust steam from the low-pressure cylinder of the triple-expansion engine powered the turbine. The turbine drove the same shaft as the piston engine by double-reduction gearing and a Föttinger fluid coupling.

The combined power of her piston engine and turbine was 367 NHP.

In 1939 Deschimag built a sister ship, Schwaneck, to the same dimensions for DDG Hansa.

World War II seizure and service
On 10 May 1940 crew of  seized Soneck for the Dutch government, who renamed her Karsik and contracted Koninklijke Paketvaart-Maatschappij (KPM) to operate her in the Dutch East Indies as a train ferry.

Karsik was one of 21 KPM vessels that took refuge in Australian ports after the fall of Java that Dutch officials requested be put into service for the war effort. The ship, among others, was chartered by the Chief Quartermaster, US Army Forces in Australia (USAFIA) on 26 March 1942 with long term details to be negotiated at higher levels to become part of the US Army's local fleet crewed by its KPM officers and men with the number X-20. 

Mayo notes the fact a large ship had arrived and thus the supply line had opened as having perhaps even greater significance than the arrival of the tanks.

Karsik returned on 14 December with a second load of tanks for the forces at Buna. Karsiks first trip with tanks to Oro Bay was named "Operation Karsik" and the second was "Operation Tramsik" and immediately preceded the regular convoys of Operation Lilliput.

Post war
In 1963 the Leecho Steam Ship Company (Yong and Lee Timber of Hong Kong) bought Karsik, renamed her Pearl of Victoria and registered her in Panama. On 17 June 1967 she struck the Mismari Reef off Jeddah in the Red Sea and was wrecked.

Footnotes

References

Notes

Bibliography

1938 ships
Maritime incidents in 1967
Ships built in Bremen (state)
Shipwrecks in the Red Sea
Steamships of Germany
Steamships of the Netherlands
World War II merchant ships of Germany
World War II merchant ships of the Netherlands